The 2008 Halton Borough Council election took place on 1 May 2008 to elect members of Halton Unitary Council in Cheshire, England. One third of the council was up for election and the Labour party stayed in overall control of the council.

After the election, the composition of the council was
Labour 33
Liberal Democrat 14
Conservative 9

Campaign
20 seats were contested in the election with Labour defending 12, the Liberal Democrats 6 and the Conservatives 2. Among these seats were those of the Labour leader of the council, Tony McDermott, and the Liberal Democrat group leader, Linda Redhead. There were 63 candidates including 20 from Labour, 19 each from the Conservatives and Liberal Democrats, 4 from the Green party and 1 Citizens Party of Halton candidate. Labour were expected to remain in control of the council, but both Liberal Democrats and Conservatives were hoping to make gains, with the Liberal Democrats targeting Runcorn and the wards of Castlefields and Halton Brook.

A big issue in the election was a plan for an Ineos Chlor heat and power plant in the area with both the Liberal Democrats and Conservatives raising concerns from residents. Other issues included the Mersey Gateway project and the government Building Schools for the Future programme for building new schools. Labour were happy to defend their record in control of the council, but the Conservatives attacked council tax rises over the previous decade and the Liberal Democrats said that Runcorn had been neglected in favour of Widnes.

Results
The results saw Labour remain in control of the council as they had been since it became a unitary authority in 1998. Labour held all 12 seats they had been defending, including the leader of the council, Tony McDermott, who was comfortably re-elected in Broadheath ward. He described the results as being a "real vote of confidence in the party".

However, in Halton Brook ward the Labour councillor Stef Nelson only held his seat after a tie which required the drawing of lots. Both Nelson and the Liberal Democrat candidate, Louise Whitley, won 551 votes after 7 recounts, requiring the Returning Officer to draw a lot to decide the result, with Nelson successful and thus being declared to have won the election by 1 vote.

The only seat to change hands was Daresbury, where the Conservative Marjorie Bradshaw gained from the Liberal Democrats, in a ward which her husband had won in the 2007 election. Elsewhere the Green Party significantly reduced the Labour majority in Halton View ward. Overall turnout in the election was slightly down at 26.84%.

Ward results

References

2008 English local elections
2008
2000s in Cheshire